"One Bourbon, One Scotch, One Beer" (originally "One Scotch, One Bourbon, One Beer") is a blues song written by Rudy Toombs and recorded by Amos Milburn in 1953. It is one of several drinking songs recorded by Milburn in the early 1950s that placed in the top ten of the Billboard R&B chart.  Other artists released popular recordings of the song, including John Lee Hooker in 1966 and George Thorogood in 1977.

Original song
"One Scotch, One Bourbon, One Beer" is one of Amos Milburn's popular alcohol-themed songs, that included "Bad, Bad Whiskey" (1950), "Thinking and Drinking" (1952), "Let Me Go Home, Whiskey" (1953), and "Good, Good Whiskey" (1954). Written by Rudy Toombs, is a mid-tempo song, sometimes described as a jump blues. Milburn recorded the song on June 30, 1953, at Audio-Video Recording studios in New York City.

The lyrics tell the story of a man who is "in a bar at closing time trying to get enough booze down his neck to forget that his girlfriend's gone AWOL, harassing a tired, bored bartender who simply wants to close up and go home into serving just one more round". The song's refrain includes:

Released as a single by Aladdin Records, the performers are listed as "Amos Milburn and His Aladdin Chickenshackers" after his first number one single "Chicken Shack Boogie". It became Milburn's second-to-last appearance on the record charts, when the single reached number two on the Billboard R&B chart during a fourteen-week stay in 1953. 

Subsequently, when Milburn performed at clubs, he "incorporated three shot glasses lined up across the top of his piano [which] were filled more often than they should have been by obliging fans or by Milburn himself".  Several of Milburn's contemporaries commented on his indulgence; Milburn added "I practiced what I preached". The song is included on several Milburn anthologies, such as Down the Road Apiece: The Best of Amos Milburn (1994, EMI America) and Blues, Barrelhouse & Boogie Woogie: The Best of Amos Milburn (1996, Capitol Records).

John Lee Hooker
In 1966, John Lee Hooker recorded the song as "One Bourbon, One Scotch, One Beer". It is often identified as an adaptation or cover of the Toombs/Milburn song.  However, biographer Charles Shaar Murray, while acknowledging Hooker's song is "derived from Amos Milburn's [song]", believes Hooker made the song his own as he had done in adapting several other earlier popular tunes. Murray calls the process "Hookerization", in which Hooker made it "into a vehicle for himself [but] edited the verse down to its essentials, filled in the gaps with narrative and dialogue, and set the whole thing to a rocking cross between South Side shuffle and signature boogie". Hooker's opening verse is more insistent than Toombs:

He then adds a narrative:

Hooker's song is notated as a medium tempo blues with an irregular number of bars in 4/4 time in the key of E.  It was recorded in Chicago in 1966 with Hooker on vocal and guitar, guitarist Eddie "Guitar" Burns, and unknown accompanists.  The song was released on the Chess Records album The Real Folk Blues (1966). A live version with Muddy Waters' band recorded at the Cafe Au Go Go on August 30, 1966, has been described as "dark, slow, swampy-deep, and the degree of emotional rapport between Hooker and the band (particularly Otis Spann) [is] nothing less than extraordinary".

George Thorogood
George Thorogood recorded "One Bourbon, One Scotch, One Beer" for his 1977 debut album, George Thorogood and the Destroyers.  His version is a medley of the song and another Hooker song, "House Rent Boogie", which serves as a backstory to explain the singer's situation. According to Hooker, "He [Thorogood] told me he was gonna do that [and] I said, 'Okay, go ahead'".  Live recordings of the medley are included on Live (1986) and 30th Anniversary Tour: Live (2004).

References

Bibliography

1953 songs
Blues songs
1953 singles
Songs written by Rudy Toombs
John Lee Hooker songs
George Thorogood songs
Songs about alcohol
Aladdin Records singles